This an incomplete list of the primary bus routes in Malta and Gozo. A map summarizing routes is available here.

Transportation Impact
The public bus system routes service all major areas in Malta and is the main form of transportation in the country. The bus service can be accessed with either a tallinja card or paper tickets.

Current routes
On 3 July 2011, the Arriva group took over operation of scheduled bus services on Malta and Gozo, only to relinquish it in December 2013. A new government-owned company called Malta Public Transport took over fleet and operations, while a call for new operators to submit their bids was issued. The pattern of routes was substantially changed when the new network took effect. As of August, 2016 there are 400 buses servicing these routes.

Mainline routes
The following routes link Valletta to major towns and villages around the island. All are operated by Malta Public Transport and are marketed as Mainline.

Express Routes

Night Buses routes

Special Summer Routes 2016
The following routes are only available from July to September 2016 and will offer a direct service between the Malta International Airport and Malta's main localities. The service is offered by Malta Public Transport under its 'Tallinja' brand, therefore the routes start with a TD and are followed by 02 and 03. TD stands for Tallinja Direct.

Gozo routes
The following routes are operated by Malta Public Transport in Gozo.

Former Arriva Routes

Since the beginning of the new public transport service in Malta and Gozo, several routes have been altered or withdrawn (These routes are no longer correct, and it is not suggested that information regarding buses is taken from the following list):

Proposed Routes 2014

Malta

Gozo

Pre-Arriva routes
These routes operated prior to the introduction of the new network on 3 July 2011.

The following bus routes operated on Gozo prior to the new network's introduction.

References 

Malta
Bus transport in Malta
Bus routes